The Antonyo Awards are awards recognizing excellence of Black artists in theatre. Founded in 2020, the awards ceremony was produced by Broadway Black and honors Black artists from both the Broadway and Off-Broadway theatre communities.

Founding and inaugural ceremony
The Antonyo Awards were created in 2020 by Drew Shade. Shade founded Broadway Black in 2012, an organization that supports Black theatre and which helped produce the awards ceremony. Dustin Ross, a close friend of Shade, named the ceremony the "Antonyo Awards" as a  light-hearted joke in reference to The Tony Awards. An additional purpose of the awards is to shed light on systemic racism in the New York theatre, a mostly-white institution, in the light of the racial protests that rocked America following the murder of George Floyd, and the deaths of Breonna Taylor, Eric Garner, and others. No one was paid to participate in or run these awards.

The nominees were selected by a nominating committee. However, since it was not as easy to get voters to see every show due to the shutdown of theatres across the nation due to the pandemic, the winners were chosen by people voting online. Around 8,000 people voted. There were no gendered categories. Also, all presenters and winners had their pronouns listed as well as their names on screen.

Due to the coronavirus pandemic, there were no live awards in the inaugural ceremony. The awards took place over a YouTube livestream, but may be in-person if future Antonyo Awards ceremonies are announced. The ceremony took place on June 19, 2020, since Juneteenth is the holiday commemorating the freedom from slavery for Black Americans in 1865. However, despite there being no live ceremony, there was a "red carpet" livestream one hour before the ceremony hosted by Chadaé McAlister, as well as an after-party hosted by Amber Iman with music by DJ Dorian,  Both featured interviews with nominees and winners. The ceremony was hosted by Drew Shade. The event not only included the announcing of the winners, but also musical performances, skits, and monologues by Black playwrights performed by Black theatre artists that highlighted the struggles, joys and resilience of Black artists. Additionally, due to the coronavirus preventing many graduations from happening, nominee and actor Shereen Pimentel gave a commencement speech to the class of 2020, as she would have been graduating in 2020.

There were four non-competitive awards called the Kinfolk Awards which were created to honor individuals who were committed to the advancement of Black theatre in New York City. The Lorraine Hansberry Award was given to a female identifying or nonbinary femme Black playwright or book writer who incorporates themes of social justice into their work. The Langston Hughes Award was given to a male-identifying or nonbinary masculine Black playwright or book writer who balances storytelling and social justice ideology in their work. The Welcome Award is for a Black newcomer to New York City theatre. The Doors of the Theatre are Open Award is for a theatre company that has been dedicated to uplifting Black voices.

Recipients

2020

Non-competitive awards
Lifetime Achievement Award: Chuck Cooper

The Kinfolk Awards

In memoriam

2020

Lucien Barbarin
Diahann Carroll
Walter Dallas
Ja'Net DuBois
Margaret Holloway
Andile Gumbi
Mykal D Laury II

Dr. Vernell Lillie
Lloyd Cornelius Porter
Keldon Price
L. Kenneth Richardson
Darius Smith
Danny Tidwell

References 

2020 awards in the United States
Musical theatre awards
American theater awards
2020 theatre awards
Dramatist and playwright awards
Theatre acting awards
Black theatre
African-American theatre
Awards established in 2020